C. William O'Neill  (February 14, 1916 – August 20, 1978) was an American Republican politician, who served as the 59th governor of Ohio.

Biography
He was born in Marietta, Ohio. He was the 59th Governor of Ohio. He graduated from both Marietta College (1938) and The Ohio State University Moritz College of Law (1942).  While at Marietta he joined The Delta Upsilon University.

O'Neill served as a state representative and as Speaker of the House.  He was then elected the State Attorney General in 1950, being the youngest person elected to the office at age 34. He served from 1951–1957, when he was elected to the governorship. O'Neill served until 1959.  He was defeated for re-election due to his support of the controversial proposed "right to work" amendment to the Ohio Constitution.  He served on the Ohio Supreme Court from 1960 until his death serving as an associate justice, then chief justice.  O'Neill was the only Ohioan to serve in top leadership positions in the legislative, executive and judicial branches of Ohio.

O'Neill was married to Betty Hewson on July 29, 1945, and they had two children. He died August 20, 1978, and his funeral service was at First Community Church in Columbus. He was buried at Oak Grove Cemetery in Marietta.

Legacy
The O'Neill Building at the Ohio Expo Center and State Fair in Columbus, Ohio, is named in honor of O'Neill. Additionally, The C. William O'Neill Senior Citizens Center in Marietta, Ohio is named in his honor.

References

External links
https://web.archive.org/web/20041113150133/http://www.ohiohistory.org/onlinedoc/ohgovernment/governors/oneill.html

 Ohio Expo Center
 Ohio State Fair

Ohio Attorneys General
Marietta College alumni
Ohio State University Moritz College of Law alumni
1916 births
1978 deaths
Republican Party members of the Ohio House of Representatives
Politicians from Marietta, Ohio
Chief Justices of the Ohio Supreme Court
Speakers of the Ohio House of Representatives
Republican Party governors of Ohio
20th-century American lawyers
20th-century American judges
20th-century American politicians